Taj Matthews (born March 24, 1976 in San Antonio, Texas) is an American journalist, entrepreneur, author of Grandpa was a Preacher: A Letter to my Grandson. The book is the autobiography of his grandfather civil rights icon Rev. Claude Black Jr., who describes life as a minister, civil rights leader and politician. After nearly 20 years, Matthews returned to his hometown of San Antonio, Texas from Jacksonville, Florida. He currently serves as Executive Director of the Claude & ZerNona Black Developmental Leadership Foundation

External links
Official site
Claude & ZerNona Black Foundation
Carrying The Torch
Four Honored at Claude Black Heroes Banquet
Matthews speaks on Birthright Immigration Debate
Fight for Immigration Reform
Can do Spirits Prevails at Eastside Talks

1976 births
Living people
People from San Antonio
Writers from Jacksonville, Florida
Activists for African-American civil rights
American male journalists
Journalists from Texas
Activists from Texas